Christopher Attys (born 13 March 2001) is a footballer who plays as a midfielder for Italian  club Trento. Born in France, he has been called up to represent Haiti as a youth international.

Career
In 2018, Attys joined the youth academy of Italian Serie A side Inter Milan from the youth academy of Torcy in the French sixth division. In 2020, he was sent on loan to Italian second division club SPAL. In 2021, he was sent on loan to Šibenik in Croatia. On 18 September 2021, Attys debuted for Šibenik in a 2–1 win over Lokomotiva.

On 6 January 2023, Attys moved to Trento.

Career statistics

Club

References

External links
 
 

2001 births
French sportspeople of Haitian descent
Living people
Haitian footballers
Association football midfielders
HNK Šibenik players
Imolese Calcio 1919 players
A.C. Trento 1921 players
Croatian Football League players
Serie C players
Haitian expatriate footballers
Expatriate footballers in Italy
Haitian expatriate sportspeople in Italy
Expatriate footballers in Croatia
Haitian expatriate sportspeople in Croatia
Inter Milan players